The men's 4 × 100 metre freestyle relay competition of the swimming events at the 2019 Pan American Games are scheduled to be held August 6th, 2019 at the Villa Deportiva Nacional Videna cluster.

Records
Prior to this competition, the existing world and Pan American Games records were as follows:

Results

Final
The final round was held on August 6.

References

Swimming at the 2019 Pan American Games